is a Japanese actress. She is represented with Production Harmony.

Biography
In 1997, Yoshino won Shufu to Seikatsusha Junon "S.S Girls Contest" Jury Special Award. In the same year, she received the Eye'X "Beautiful Girl with Eyes" Grand Prix.
After graduating from university, she restored her entertainment name to real name around 2003 and resumed entertainment activities as an actress.
Yoshino started to appear in the reproduction VTR of Fuji Television's Wakatte chōdai!, and then she has a reputation for the S character because of Noch's role as a lady played at Gyōretsu no dekiru Hōritsu Sōdanjo.
She has a younger brother under two years old.

Filmography

Television dramas

Films

Variety (reproduction dramas)

Other TV appearances

Stage

Advertisements

DVD

Others

References

External links
 – Production Harmony 
 – Ameba Blog 
 (official website) 

Actors from Fukuoka Prefecture
People from Iizuka, Fukuoka
1980 births
Living people
21st-century Japanese actresses